Amazingness is an American talent show competition hosted by Rob Dyrdek. It ran from December 8, 2017, to January 19, 2018 on MTV.

Format
Every episode features six contestants showcasing their unique talents. After each performance, the judges decide who moves on and who is eliminated. The last performer standing is awarded $10,000.

Episodes

References

External links
 Amazingness at IMDb

MTV original programming
2010s American video clip television series
2017 American television series debuts
2018 American television series endings
American television spin-offs